The 1966 Kansas City Chiefs season was the team's seventh season in the American Football League (AFL) and fourth in Kansas City. With an 11–2–1 regular season record, the Chiefs won the Western Division and defeated the Buffalo Bills to win their second AFL Championship, their first in Kansas City.

The AFL, also in its seventh season, became a nine-team league in 1966 with the addition of the expansion Miami Dolphins. The 14-game AFL schedule had the teams play six opponents twice and the remaining two once, both from the other division.  The sole games for the Chiefs in 1966 were against the New York Jets and Houston Oilers, both victories.

In previous years, the AFL title game concluded the season, but not in 1966, following the merger agreement in June. The Chiefs were invited to play in the inaugural AFL-NFL World Championship Game, later known as Super Bowl I, against the NFL's Green Bay Packers.  After a competitive first half, the underdog Chiefs lost momentum and the Packers won 35–10.

The franchise's previous AFL title was four years earlier in 1962 as the Dallas Texans.

Roster

Regular season
With an 11–2–1 record, the Chiefs clinched the Western division title with two games remaining on November 27, following a win over Jets in New York. This earned a berth in the AFL championship game, played on the road against the two-time defending champion Buffalo Bills (9–4–1), winners of the Eastern division for the third consecutive season.

Schedule
Two bye weeks were necessary in 1966, as the league expanded to an odd-number (9) of teams; one team was idle each week (three teams were idle in week one). The Chiefs played all teams twice, except for two from other the Eastern Division, Houston and New York.

Standings

Postseason

Schedule

1966 AFL Championship

January 1, 1967, at War Memorial Stadium in Buffalo, New YorkAttendance: 42,080

The host Bills entered the AFL title game as two-time defending champions, but the visiting Chiefs were three-point favorites, mainly because of their explosive and innovative offense led by head coach Hank Stram. The Bills were a more conventional team with a solid defensive line and a running mindset on offense. The two teams had split their season series, played early in the schedule without weather as a factor, with the road team winning each.

Played in a chilly drizzle, a Bills fumble on the opening kickoff gave the Chiefs a short field to work with. Quarterback Len Dawson immediately took advantage of it, hitting Fred Arbanas for the game's first score. Buffalo quarterback Jack Kemp's first pass for the Bills was a 69-yard score to Elbert Dubenion. Late in the second quarter and trailing 14–7, Kemp led the Bills to the Kansas City 10. Bobby Crockett was open in the end zone, but Kemp's pass was intercepted by Johnny Robinson, who returned it 72 yards. That set up a Mike Mercer field goal to close out the first half with a ten-point lead.

Buffalo found no offensive rhythm in the second half, and the third quarter was scoreless. The Chiefs closed the game out in the fourth quarter with Dawson found Chris Burford for a 45-yard gain, setting up a one-foot touchdown run by rookie running back Mike Garrett, extending the lead to 24–7. Garrett scored his second touchdown less than two minutes later, following another Bills fumble.

Scoring summary
First quarter
KC – Arbanas 29 pass from Dawson (Mercer kick), KC 7–0
BUF – Dubenion 69 pass from Kemp (Lusteg kick), 7–7 Tie
Second quarter
KC – Taylor 29 pass from Dawson (Mercer kick), KC 14–7
KC – Field goal Mercer 32, KC 17–7
Third quarter
no scoring
Fourth quarter
KC – Garrett 1 run (Mercer kick), KC 24–7
KC – Garrett 18 run (Mercer kick), KC 31–7

Upon their return to Kansas City, the Chiefs were greeted by 12,000 fans at the airport. They split their players' shares for the title game 51 ways, or $5,308 each.

First AFL-NFL World Championship (Super Bowl I)

January 15, 1967, at Los Angeles Memorial Coliseum in Los Angeles, CaliforniaAttendance: 61,946

The first AFL-NFL World Championship Game, later known as Super Bowl I, was played at the Los Angeles Memorial Coliseum on January 15, 1967. The Chiefs faced the Green Bay Packers of the NFL, who finished their regular season at 12–2 and won the NFL championship game, their second consecutive and fourth in six seasons.

The Packers jumped out to an early 7–0 lead with quarterback Bart Starr's 37-yard touchdown pass to reserve receiver Max McGee, who had entered the game a few plays earlier for re-injured starter Boyd Dowler. Early in the second quarter, Kansas City marched 66 yards in 6 plays to tie the game on a 7-yard pass from quarterback Len Dawson to Curtis McClinton. But the Packers responded on their next drive, advancing 73 yards down the field and scoring on fullback Jim Taylor's 14-yard touchdown run with the team's famed "Power Sweep" play. With a minute left in the half, the lead was cut to 14–10 on Mike Mercer's 31-yard field goal.

Early in the second half, Dawson was intercepted by safety Willie Wood, who  returned it 50 yards to the 5-yard line. On the next play, running back Elijah Pitts rushed for a touchdown, and the Packers led 21–10. Late in the third quarter, McGee scored his second touchdown of the game with a 13-yard reception from Starr, as Green Bay held the Chiefs' offense to 12 yards in the quarter. Pitts scored another touchdown for the Packers from a yard out midway through the fourth quarter for the final score, 35–10. Starr was named the MVP of the game, completing 16 of 23 passes for 250 yards and two touchdowns.

Scoring summary
First quarter
GB – McGee 37 pass from Starr (Chandler kick), 7–0 GB
Second quarter
KC – McClinton 7 pass from Dawson (Mercer kick), 7–7 Tie
GB – Taylor 14 run (Chandler kick), 14–7 GB
KC – FG Mercer 31, 14–10 GB
Third quarter
GB – Pitts 5 run (Chandler kick), 21–10 GB
GB – McGee 13 pass from Starr (Chandler kick), 28–10 GB
Fourth quarter
GB – Pitts 1 run  (Chandler kick), 35–10 GB

The Kansas City players received $7,500 each as runners-up; combined with the AFL title game money, each Chief earned over $12,800 in the two-game postseason.

References

External links
1966 Kansas City Chiefs on Database Football

1966 Kansas City Chiefs season
Kansas City Chiefs
American Football League championship seasons
Kansas